Ryan Hemphill (born December 30, 1981) is a former NASCAR driver from Apollo, Pennsylvania.

Racing career
Hemphill, a second generation racer, started his racing career at the age of 12, when his father put him behind the wheel of a go-kart. He went on to race in go-carts both locally and nationally for a period of 3 years. During this span, Hemphill collected approximately 50 wins.

At the age of 15, Hemphill advanced to Legacy cars (three-quarter scale Nextel Cup cars), where he competed for 2 years and amassed 5 wins and 3 poles including winning the Blue-Grey Shootout at the Jennerstown Speedway(PA) and the Fireball Roberts Memorial at the famed Hickory Motor Speedway (NC).

In 1999, while a senior at Kiski Area High School (PA), Hemphill moved into Late Model competition locally at the Motordrome (PA) and Jennerstown (PA) Speedways. In impressive fashion Hemphill won the Rookie of the Year Award at both of these tracks. At the Motordrome Speedway, Hemphill garnered 20 top 10 finishes in 20 starts while finishing 2nd in the tight points battle, while at Jennerstown he finished a strong 6th in points.

The 2000 season saw Hemphill continue his maturation as a race car driver. He continued his participation at the Motordrome Speedway as he finished 3rd in the overall points and collected 3 wins, 17 top 5 and 10 top 10 finishes. Hemphillalso stepped up with his participation in 2 American Speed Association (ASA) events where he finished 12th in both. The year was capped off with his high school graduation and being named Auto Racing Club of Hagerstown (MD) Sportsman of the Year.

In 2001, Hemphill concentrated on gaining as much experience behind the wheel of a race car as possible. He limited his Motordrome Speedway schedule to 11 events where he won 5 times and earned 10 top 5 finishes. He expanded his ASA schedule and competed in 6 events with a season best 6th-place finish at the Chicago Motor Speedway. Hemphill also moved up to the NASCAR All-Pro Series and impressed many with his 3rd-place finish at Memphis Motorsports Park in his first race as well as a 4th-place finish in his ARCA Re/Max Series debut at the Milwaukee Mile. He was also selected as a member of the GM Vortec Power Team Professionals.

Hemphill made himself known in 2002 and 2003 driving in the NASCAR Craftsman Truck Series for multiple owners, including Rick Ware, Bobby Hamilton, and Billy Ballew.  In nine races, he scored one top ten.

Hemphill broke out in the 2004 ARCA season, scoring 6 wins and 10 top tens in eleven races, under the Chip Ganassi Racing driver development program.  In 2005, Hemphill was promoted to the NASCAR Busch Series in the Biagi Brothers Racing Ganassi-assisted program, driving the No. 4 GEICO Dodge Charger.  However, after eleven races, with only mediocre results, Hemphill was released from the car and from his Chip Ganassi Racing driver development program and  finished last in the 2005 NASCAR Busch Series Rookie of the Year standings.

Motorsports career results

NASCAR
(key) (Bold - Pole position awarded by qualifying time. Italics - Pole position earned by points standings or practice time. * – Most laps led.)

Busch Series

Craftsman Truck Series

ARCA Re/Max Series
(key) (Bold – Pole position awarded by qualifying time. Italics – Pole position earned by points standings or practice time. * – Most laps led.)

References

External links
 

1981 births
American Speed Association drivers
ARCA Menards Series drivers
Living people
NASCAR drivers
People from Armstrong County, Pennsylvania
Racing drivers from Pennsylvania